Estádio Antônio Cruz is a multi-use stadium in Fortaleza, Ceará, Brazil. It is used mostly for football matches, and has a maximum capacity of 3,000 people.

References

Football venues in Ceará
FC Atlético Cearense
Sports venues in Ceará